Mahalakshmi Layout Assembly Constituency is one of the 224 legislative assembly segments of the state of Karnataka. It is a part of Bengaluru Urban district and comes under the Bengaluru North parliamentary constituency.

The constituency was formed in the year 2008, carved out of portions of Rajajinagar, Yelahanka and the erstwhile Uttarahalli Assembly constituencies. The constituency is predominantly urban in nature with a mix of old residential areas, industrial areas and slums. It comprises the northern parts of West Bengaluru such as Mahalakshmi Layout, Nandini Layout, Yeshwanthapur APMC Yard, Goraguntepalya, Kanteerava Nagar, Shankar Nagar, Saraswathipura, Nagapura, Kurubarahalli, Kamalanagar, Vrishabhavathi Nagar and also parts of Basaveshwaranagar and Kamakshipalya.

The MLA for Mahalakshmi Layout as of 2019 is K. Gopalaiah of the Bharatiya Janata Party (BJP).

Wards
Mahalakshmi Layout Assembly constituency includes the following 7 wards of the Bruhat Bengaluru Mahanagara Palike (BBMP):

Members of Legislative Assembly

Election results

See also
 Government of Karnataka
 Vidhan Sabha
 Mahalakshmi Layout

References

External links
Mahalakshmi Layout (156) ASSEMBLY ELECTION 2018

Bangalore Urban district
Assembly constituencies of Karnataka